20th Century Battlefields is a BBC documentary television series hosted by television and radio personality Peter Snow, and his son Dan Snow.

Episodes cover the major battles of the twentieth century, and is best known for its extensive use of "sand table" (often called the "mapcase" in both series) CGI effects to help viewers visualize the battles.

Production
Dan Snow has admitted that during the production he bickered with his father about the significance of certain battles such as the Spanish Armada at Gravelines and who won the Yom Kippur war. He also expressed concern over his father's health during filming in the Middle East when his father was becoming tired and run down from not drinking enough water.

Episode list

Episode 1: 1918 Western Front
Covers the Battle of Amiens, and in particular the innovative tactics invented, most notably the close coordination of infantry, tanks and aircraft which characterises modern battles shown by the British commander Douglas Haig, as well as basic infiltration tactics. Peter and Dan Snow observe a combined-arms exercise.

Episode 2: 1942 Midway
Covers the War in the Pacific from the Attack on Pearl Harbor and the Battle of the Coral Sea and then in more detail on the Battle of Midway. The episode also focuses on the rise of the aircraft carrier in World War II. Dan Snow takes part in a training exercise with the Royal Navy where they tackle a simulated engine room fire.

Episode 3: 1942 Stalingrad
Covers the Eastern Front briefly up to the Battle of Stalingrad and then describes the battle in detail from the initial attacks on the city to the surrounding and eventual destruction of the German 6th Army. Focuses in particular on urban warfare tactics employed, especially snipers. Dan Snow spends some time with the British Army Snipers to illustrate the power of the sniper, targeting a command post occupied by Peter Snow. Dan succeeds in 'assassinating' his father.

Episode 4: 1951 Korea
Covers the entire Korean War from the initial invasion by North Korea until the final ceasefire (but not peace treaty, as it is shown the two nations are still technically at war) after Chinese involvement. Focuses in particular on the retaking of Seoul and then the Battle of the Imjin River as the main fight shown. Peter and Dan experience the power of artillery.

Episode 5: 1968 Vietnam
Covers the Tet Offensive, in particular the fighting at Saigon and Khe Sanh, but the main focus is on the Battle of Hue. Dan Snow participates in training for urban assault.

Episode 6: 1973 Middle East
Covers the Yom Kippur War from start to finish concentrating on both the Syrian and Egyptian fronts. It also briefly covers the six day war of 1967, in which Israel launched a preemptive strike against Syria, Jordan and Egypt. Does not cover one engagement primarily, other than a slight focus on the Battle of Chinese Farm near the Suez Canal.  The Palestinian struggle for statehood is heavily emphasized. The episode is filmed in the Negev Desert in Southern Israel, since neither Egypt nor Syria gave permission to film in their countries. Dan Snow learns how to operate an anti-tank missile.

Episode 7: 1982 Falklands
Covers the Falklands War from start to finish. Beginning with the invasion of the island, it then details all major engagements of the conflict from the sinking of General Belgrano, the sinking of HMS Sheffield, the British landing on the Falklands, Battle of Goose Green, and finally the battle for Stanley. Dan Snow practices night fighting with the British Army.

Episode 8: 1991 Gulf War
Covers the First Gulf War from start to finish. Beginning with the invasion and occupation of Kuwait the episode then details the retaking of the country by the UN coalition. It covers in most detail the air campaign (noting the changes in tactics to respond to international pressure) and then the ground attack. No individual engagement is given priority, though an amount of time is given to non-combat events, such as the burning of oil wells and SCUD attacks on Tel-Aviv. Dan Snow experiences operating in gas masks.

See also
 Battlefield Britain

References

External links
 
 Discovery Military website
 

British military television series
American Heroes Channel original programming
Documentary television series about aviation
Documentary television series about war
2007 British television series debuts
2007 British television series endings
2000s British documentary television series
English-language television shows
Works about the Falklands War
Works about the Gulf War
Works about the Korean War
Works about the Vietnam War
BBC television documentaries about history during the 20th Century